The 1987 UCF Knights football season was the ninth for the team. It was the third season for Gene McDowell as the head coach of the Knights. After posting an 8–3 regular season record in 1987, the Knights earned their first trip to the Division II playoffs, where they earned a 1–1 record, falling in the Semifinals.

The Knights competed as an NCAA Division II Independent. The team played their home games at the Citrus Bowl in Downtown Orlando. The Knights finished undefeated (7–0) against Division II opponents during the regular season. Their only losses during the regular season came to Division I-AA opponents, two of which were I-AA playoff teams. The Knights strength of schedule (the toughest in Division II), helped qualify them for the playoff bracket.

Schedule

References

UCF
UCF Knights football seasons
UCF Knights football